Oceanian languages may refer to:
Oceanic languages, a family of Austronesian languages spoken in Polynesia, Melanesia, and Micronesia
Languages of Oceania, a list of languages spoken in Oceania